Megistobunus is a genus of harvestmen in the family Phalangiidae.

Species
 Megistobunus funereus Lawrence, 1962
 Megistobunus lamottei (Roewer, 1959)
 Megistobunus longipes Hansen, 1921

References

Harvestmen
Harvestman genera